Abraxas labraria is a species of moth belonging to the family Geometridae. It was described by Achille Guenée in 1857. It is known from Java.

References

Abraxini
Moths of Indonesia
Moths described in 1857